Hatley is a township in the Memphrémagog Regional County Municipality in the Eastern Townships region of Quebec, Canada. The township had a population of 2,003 as of the Canada 2011 Census.

Demographics 

See also 
 List of township municipalities in Quebec

References

External links

Township municipalities in Quebec
Incorporated places in Estrie